Axiom Space, Inc., also known as Axiom Space, is an American privately funded space infrastructure developer headquartered in Houston, Texas.

Founded in 2016 by Michael T. Suffredini and Kam Ghaffarian, the company first flew a spaceflight in 2022: Axiom Mission 1, the first commercially crewed private spaceflight to the International Space Station. The company aims to own and operate the world's first commercial space station in 2025. The company's employees include former NASA Administrator Charles Bolden and astronauts Michael Lopez-Alegria and Brent W. Jett Jr.

The company sent its first commercial astronauts into orbit in 2022. It also plans human spaceflight for government-funded and commercial astronauts engaging in in-space research, in-space manufacturing, and space exploration.

History 

Axiom Space CEO Michael T. Suffredini was previously the program manager for the International Space Station from 2005 to 2015. After retiring from NASA, Suffredini and Kam Ghaffarian started Axiom Space to target the emerging commercial spaceflight market. Ghaffarian is an engineer and entrepreneur who sold his company, Stinger Ghaffarian Technologies, Inc., a large NASA contractor, to KBR in 2018.

The company was selected by NASA to provide the first commercial destination module on the International Space Station. Axiom Space also announced in March 2020 a contract with SpaceX to fly commercial astronauts to the International Space Station via Falcon 9 and Crew Dragon scheduled for March 2022; launch took place 8 April 2022 and crew returned on 25 April.

The company had 110 employees as of February 2021, with offices located in Houston and Los Angeles.

NASA contract for ISS modules 

In 2020, as part of the broader Next Space Technologies for Exploration Partnerships (NextSTEP) cislunar initiative, NASA awarded Axiom a US$140 million contract to provide at least one habitable spacecraft to attach to the International Space Station. Axiom Space was the only selected proposal from the solicitation process due in 2019. Bigelow Aerospace did not submit a proposal and has subsequently ceased operations.

The modules constructed by Axiom Space are designed to attach to the Harmony forward port with the intent to demonstrate an ability to commercially provide services and products in the low Earth orbit economy. The "Axiom Segment" of the station was planned, to include a node module to act as a connector, a research and manufacturing facility, a crew habitat, and a "large-windowed" module for viewing the Earth.

Axiom Station 

Axiom Station intends to have its spacecraft modules individually launched and assembled in-orbit, first attaching to the International Space Station. Before ISS retirement (and atmospheric reentry), the company plans to detach its modules and commence orbit on its own as Axiom Station. Axiom Space renderings from 2020 illustrate how modules might be berthed and relocated on the ISS by the Mobile Servicing System, specifically the Canadarm2. Canadarm2 might also continue its operations on the Axiom Space Station after the retirement of ISS in late 2020s. The company is currently targeting late 2025 for the launch of its first module to the ISS and the late-2020s for station completion.

Axiom Space plans to conduct astronaut training for commercial astronauts, to host governments and commercial partners. Up to three Axiom Space modules could attach to the International Space Station. The first module is expected to dock to the forward port of Harmony, which would require relocation of the PMA-2. Axiom Space plans to attach up to two additional modules to its initial core module, and send private astronauts to visit the modules.

The interior for Axiom Station was designed in 2018 by French architect Philippe Starck. Renderings of the habitat show a chamber with walls that are covered with tufted padding and studded with hundreds of color-changing LEDs. Axiom Space has publicly stated an intent to maintain at least one astronaut in the station continuously, who will be assigned to take care of research projects and station repairs. This includes amenities like high-speed Wi-Fi, video screens, picture windows, and a glass-walled cupola.

Human spaceflight 
Axiom Space plans to provide human spaceflight services to people, corporations, and space agencies. Missions to the International Space Station are offered by Axiom Space, with a 10-day mission including 15 weeks of training. In addition to training, Axiom Space states that the package will include mission planning, hardware development, life support, medical support, crew provisions, hardware and safety certifications, on-orbit operations, and mission management. Missions could extend for longer periods of time depending on the focus of the spaceflight.

In June 2020, NASA Administrator Jim Bridenstine said NASA was involved with the filming of a Tom Cruise movie to the ISS  with SpaceX expected to be the transportation partner for the flights.

Astronauts
  Peggy Whitson
  Michael López-Alegría
  Walter Villadei

In-space research and manufacturing 

Axiom Space intends to commercialize microgravity research and development, using the ISS National Lab until its own modules are operational.

Missions 

In early June 2021, Axiom Space announced a deal with SpaceX which added three additional crewed flights to the ISS, for a total of four.

Ax-1

Ax-2 

Ax-2 is a planned private crew mission to the ISS. The flight is slated to launch in the second quarter of 2023 and send four people to the ISS.  On 25 May 2021, Axiom Space announced that former NASA Astronaut Peggy Whitson would be the mission commander and John Shoffner would be the mission pilot. On September 20, 2022, it was reported that Saudi Arabia had bought the remaining two seats for the mission.

Ax-3 

Ax-3 is a planned private crew mission to the ISS. The flight will launch no earlier than November 2023 and carry four people to the ISS. The crew is expected to include Walter Villadei along with two Turkish astronauts and is expected to launch in late 2023.

Ax-4 
Ax-4 is a planned private crew mission to the ISS. The flight will launch no earlier than mid-2024 and carry four people to the ISS, including the winner of the Space Hero reality television show. The crew is expected to include a Hungarian astronaut.

Axiom Mission Control Center 
In January 2022, the Axiom Space Mission Control Center (or MCC-A) completed its first on-orbit operation on the ISS. The MCC-A, located at Axiom's HQ in Houston, TX, is registered as a payload operations site.

Flights

Space suit

Future NASA contracted suits 
On 1 June 2022, NASA announced it had selected Axiom Space along with competing Collins Aerospace to develop and provide astronauts with next generation spacesuit and spacewalk systems to first test and later use outside the International Space Station, as well as on the lunar surface for the crewed Artemis missions, and prepare for human missions to Mars.

See also 

 Commercialization of space
 Private spaceflight

References

External links 
 

 
American companies established in 2016
Space-based economy
Private spaceflight companies
Aerospace companies of the United States
Privately held companies based in Texas